Plymouth Rock is the disembarkation site of the Mayflower Pilgrims in 1620.

Plymouth Rock may also refer to:

 Plymouth, Rock County, Wisconsin
 Plymouth Rock Assurance
 Plymouth Rock chicken
 Plymouth Rock Studios
 USS Plymouth Rock (LSD-29)

See also